Henry S. Valk (born 1929) is Professor Emeritus of Physics at the Georgia Institute of Technology. Valk attended George Washington University where he received his B.S. in physics in 1953 and M.S. in mathematics in 1954. He then earned his Ph.D. at Washington University in St. Louis in 1957. Before joining the faculty at the Georgia Institute of Technology, Valk was a professor of physics at the University of Nebraska.

While at Georgia Tech, Valk became Dean of the College of Science and Liberal Studies, which has since split into the College of Sciences, the College of Computing, and the Ivan Allen College of Liberal Arts.

Books
H. Valk, and M. Alonso, "Quantum Mechanics" Krieger Publishing Company, Melbourne 1986

References

External links
School of Physics profile

1929 births
Living people
Washington University in St. Louis alumni
Washington University physicists
Columbian College of Arts and Sciences alumni
Georgia Tech faculty